Charles Thomas McMillen (born May 26, 1952) is an American politician, businessman, and retired professional basketball player. A Rhodes Scholar, McMillen represented Maryland's 4th congressional district from January 3, 1987, to January 3, 1993.

On March 22, 2011, he was appointed as chairman of the inaugural Board of Directors of the President's Foundation on Sports, Physical Fitness, and Nutrition. He is also the author of Out of Bounds, a critical look at the unhealthy influence of sports on ethics, and he served on the Knight Foundation's Commission on Intercollegiate Athletics investigating abuses within college sports.

Career

Basketball 

Prior to entering politics, McMillen was a star basketball player on all levels. In 1970, he was the number one high school basketball player in the U.S. coming out of Mansfield, Pennsylvania, and was the biggest recruiting catch early in Coach Lefty Driesell's career at the University of Maryland, beating out rival Coaches Dean Smith of the University of North Carolina and John Wooden of UCLA for McMillen's services. Wooden instead signed Bill Walton, who proved to be the far more consequential player. McMillen played for the Terrapins from 1971 to 1974, McMillen was also a member of the 1972 U.S. Olympic Basketball Team that lost a controversial gold medal game to the Soviet Union.

McMillen received his B.S. from University of Maryland in chemistry, which is part of the University of Maryland College of Computer, Mathematical, and Natural Sciences. After graduating from Maryland in 1974, McMillen was drafted with the ninth pick in the first round of the 1974 NBA draft by the Buffalo Braves and the first round of the 1974 ABA Draft by the Virginia Squires. McMillen signed with the Braves but postponed his entry into the NBA in order to attend the University of Oxford as a Rhodes Scholar. During his time at Oxford, McMillen was a member of the Oxford University basketball team. He also commuted to Bologna, to play for Italian club Virtus Bologna. During his eleven-year National Basketball Association career, he played for the Braves, New York Knicks, Atlanta Hawks, and Washington Bullets, before he retired in 1986 to pursue his political career.

U.S. House
He was elected to the U.S. Congress as a Democrat to represent Maryland's 4th district, and served 1987–1993 as that district's representative.

In 1992, the 4th was redrawn as a black-majority district due to a mandate from the Justice Department. His home in Crofton was drawn into the Eastern Shore-based 1st District, represented by one-term Republican Congressman Wayne Gilchrest. Although McMillen did very well in the more urbanized areas of the district near Baltimore and Washington, D.C., it was not enough to overcome Gilchrest's margin on the Eastern Shore, and McMillen lost his reelection bid.

McMillen is thought to be the tallest-ever member of Congress. At 6 feet 11 inches, he is two feet taller than Maryland Senator Barbara Mikulski, who is believed to be the shortest representative ever.

Later career
McMillen was appointed to the University System of Maryland's Board of Regents in 2007, where he served until June 30, 2015. He was replaced by Robert R. Neall whom McMillen had defeated for Congress in 1986.

In September 2015, McMillen was selected to lead the Division I-A Athletic Directors’ Association as it moved from Dallas to Washington, D.C. He remains President and Chief Executive Officer of the renamed Lead1 Association, now advocating for athletic directors at Football Bowl Subdivision universities.

Personal life
McMillen is married to Dr. Judith Niemyer. The couple have lived in Fauquier County, Virginia since 2010.

Election history

References

External links

 
 
 
 
 
 National Foundation of Sports, Fitness and Nutrition. nationalfitnessfoundation.org
 C. Thomas McMillen papers at the University of Maryland libraries

1952 births
Living people
All-American college men's basketball players
American athlete-politicians
American men's basketball players
American Rhodes Scholars
Atlanta Hawks players
Basketball players at the 1972 Summer Olympics
Basketball players from New York (state)
Buffalo Braves draft picks
Buffalo Braves players
Democratic Party members of the United States House of Representatives from Maryland
Maryland Terrapins men's basketball players
University of Maryland, College Park alumni
Medalists at the 1972 Summer Olympics
National Collegiate Basketball Hall of Fame inductees
New York Knicks players
Olympic silver medalists for the United States in basketball
Parade High School All-Americans (boys' basketball)
People from Crofton, Maryland
People from Mansfield, Pennsylvania
Politicians from Elmira, New York
Power forwards (basketball)
Sportspeople from Elmira, New York
Virginia Squires draft picks
Washington Bullets players